El Paseo Building is a two-story commercial building in downtown Carmel-by-the-Sea, California. The building is the best example of Spanish Eclectic commercial design in Carmel, inspired by the Spanish churches built in the 1880s. The building was designated in the city's Downtown Historic Conservation District Historic Property Survey on January 24, 2002. The building has been occupied by the Little Napoli restaurant since 1990.

History
The El Paseo Building was designed by the Oakland, California architectural firm of Roger Blaine and David Olsen for Lewis C. Merrill, a Carmel businessman. El Paseo means the "passageway" in Spanish. It is at the corner of Dolores Street and Seventh Avenue. It is a two-story, reinforced concrete building with an open interior courtyard built in 1928. It has colorful hand-made imported tiles from Spain on the rise of the steps on the staircase and in under the windows and front doors. It has hand-made, hand-forged wrought iron balconies and window grilles, metal lanterns designed by the architects, and every shop has a fireplace. Red floor tile covers the passageway and outside courtyard. The courtyard is now the outdoor dining area for the Little Napoli restaurant.

The building originally contained four retail stores and several offices at a cost of $25,000. Two early stores in the courtyard were Lotta Shipley's real estate office and the Moorish Rug Shop.

The building was reviewed in the Carmel Pine Cone on April 27, 1928, saying: 

The formal opening of the building was on May 1, 1928. Jo Mora completed the "El Paseo" sculpture, in the courtyard of the building. The sculpture is an example of the artistic and cultural contributions of Mora to Carmel in the 1920s. It is a terracotta sculpture of a Californio man and a Señorita woman.

On December 2, 1938, realtor Byington Ford presented to the Carmel planning group a proposal to purchase the El Paseo building for $35,000. The city’s offices would be on the ground floor, including the council chamber, and room for additional office space.

On January 24, 2002, El Paseo was designated by the city as a historic downtown building. It is one of the best preserved buildings in Carmel and has remained unchanged architecturally from when it was built.

Blaine & Olsen
Roger Blaine and David Olsen were partners with Wilson J. Wythe in the Wythe, Blaine & Olsen architecture firm in Oakland, California. They were primarily church and commercial designers. Wythe died in 1926. Blaine & Olsen traveled to Spain and became aware of the Spanish architecture. They designed a number of the best known Spanish Eclectic commercial buildings in Carmel, including La Ribera Hotel also known as the Cypress Inn, and the Kocher Building,  known as La Giralda. All of the Spanish Eclectic-style buildings were constructed from 1927 to 1929.

Blaine & Olsen works
 Kocher Building (1927)
 El Paseo Building (1928)
 La Ribera Hotel (1929)
 Draper Leidig Building (1929)

The firm Blaine & Olsen continued the partnership with a focus on Spanish Eclectic design in Oakland, Santa Barbara, and Carmel. The partnership lasted until the Great Depression in the United States.

Gallery

See also
Jo Mora

References

External links

 Downtown Conservation District Historic Property Survey
 In Public Places, the Sculpture and Architectural Adornment Work of Jo Mora

1928 establishments in California
Carmel-by-the-Sea, California
Buildings and structures in Monterey County, California
Defunct architecture firms based in California
Spanish Colonial Revival architecture in California